Katarzyna Tomicka (c.1517–1551) was a Polish noblewoman, known as the sister-in-law and opponent of her sister-in-law queen Barbara Radziwiłł.

Katarzyna was born in Iwno, the third daughter of podkomorzy of Kalisz, Jan Tomicki h. Łodzia and sister-aunt of the Court Marshal and Bishop of Kraków, Piotr Tomicki h. Łodzia. She died in Wilno.

Her sons initiated the so-called "Calvinist lineage" of the Radziwiłł family. The male line expired in 1669.

Marriage and issue
Katarzyna married Mikołaj "Rudy" Radziwiłł around 1542 and had three children:

 Mikołaj Radziwiłł, married Aleksandra Wiśniowiecka h. Korybut and later Zofia Helena Hlebowicz Połońska h. Leliwa
 Krzysztof Mikołaj "the Thunderbolt" Radziwiłł, was married to Katarzyna Sobek z Sulejówka h. Brochowicz, Princess Katarzyna Ostrogska, Katarzyna Tęczyńska h. Tópor and Princess Elizaveta Ostrogska
 NN

Bibliography
 Besala J., Barbara Radziwiłłówna i Zygmunt August, Świat Książki, Warszawa 2007, s. 138, 142.
 Boniecki A., Poczet rodów w Wielkiém Księstwie Litewskiém w XV i XVI wieku, Warszawa 1887, s. 279 (e-biblioteka Uniwersytetu Warszawskiego).

References

1510s births
1551 deaths
Katarzyna